Nik & Jay is a Danish  hip-hop/pop duo made of  Niclas Genckel Petersen (born 8 November 1980 in Herlev) and Jannik Brandt Thomsen (born 16 June 1981).

Their #2 single Hot! won them Hit of the Year and Best New Artist at the Danish Music Awards in 2003. Other hits have included En Dag Tilbage (One Day Left), Lækker (Hot), Kan Du Høre Hende Synge? (Can you hear her sing?) and Boing!.

They released a CD and DVD of their concert tour from 2003.

The single "Boing!" and the album, 3: Fresh - Fri - Fly have given them even more success and a bigger variety of ages among the fans.

Nik and Jay played soccer together in Værløse, Denmark during their youth. Nik sang in a punk band and rollerbladed while Jay was a prominent skateboarder. They began to party together then eventually began to produce music.

Discography

Albums

Studio albums

Compilation albums

Live albums

Extended plays

Singles

As main artist

As guest artist

Appearances
2005: "Hvor små vi er (as part of charity Giv til Asien) (#1)

DVDs
 2003: "Det Vi Gør" (DVD)
 2008: "De største"

Awards
Best Danish Act for the NRJ Radio Awards 2003.
They were nominated for Best Danish Act at EMA06
In 2005 they won Best Danish Artist at the Nordic Music Awards.
They have won the People's Choice Award at the Danish DeeJay Awards for years 2003, 2005, 2006 and 2007.

References

External links

Danish musical groups
People from Herlev Municipality